Boekend is a village in the Dutch province of Limburg. It is a part of the municipality of Venlo, and lies about 4 km west of the city center.

In 2001, Boekend had 328 inhabitants. The built-up area of the village was 0.1 km², and contained 122 residences.

References

Boroughs of Venlo
Populated places in Limburg (Netherlands)